Clarien Bank Limited is one of four licensed banks in Bermuda. It was formerly known as Capital G Bank.

The bank is a subsidiary of Bermuda company CWH Limited which amalgamated with Capital G Bank in 2014 after which CWH became the majority shareholder.

Capital G Bank arose from the formation of Gibbons Deposit Company in 1974.

The chief executive is Ian G. Truran.

External links
 Official Website

References

Banks of Bermuda